Peter John Vipond (born December 8, 1949) is a retired professional ice hockey winger who played 3 games in the National Hockey League for the California Golden Seals during the 1972–73 season. The rest of his career was spent in various minor leagues, and he retired in 1978.

Career statistics

Regular season and playoffs

External links

1949 births
Living people
California Golden Seals players
Canadian ice hockey left wingers
Ice hockey people from Ontario
Oakland Seals draft picks
Oshawa Generals players
Sportspeople from Whitby, Ontario
Western International Hockey League players